Bill S. Hansson (born 1959) is a Swedish neuroethologist. From June 2014 until June 2020, he was vice president of the Max Planck Society.

Scientific career 
Hansson studied biology at Lund University where he received a Bachelor of Science degree in Biology in 1982. In 1988 he defended his PhD thesis in Ecology. From 1989-90 he worked as postdoc at the University of Arizona and returned 1990 to a junior professorship in Lund. In 1992 he became Associate Professor and from 2000 until 2001 he was a Professor for Chemical Ecology at Lund University (2000). From 2001 he was Professor and Head of the Chemical Ecology department at the Swedish University of Agricultural Sciences (SLU) in Alnarp, Sweden, until he was appointed Director and Scientific Member at the Max Planck Institute for Chemical Ecology in Jena, Germany in 2006. He is head of the Department of Evolutionary Neuroethology. In 2010 the Friedrich Schiller University in Jena appointed him Honorary Professor.

Hansson's research focuses on neuroethological aspects of insect-insect and insect-plant interactions. He is mainly studying insect olfaction, where his central questions are: How is semiochemical information (odors) detected by the antenna and processed in the insect brain, how did these detection and processing systems evolve, and how does olfaction guide insect behavior? He also compares these systems to other land-living arthropods, as the giant robber crab on Christmas Island.

Awards and honors
 The Takasago International Research Award in Olfactory Science 1998
 International Award of the Jean-Marie Delwart Foundation 2000
 Letterstedt Prize of the Royal Swedish Academy of Sciences 2009
 Fellow of the Saxonian Academy of Sciences 2010
 Fellow of the Royal Swedish Academy of Sciences 2011
 Fellow of the Royal Swedish Academy of Agriculture and Forestry
 Honorary Fellow of the Royal Entomological Society 2011
 Elected member of the Academia Europaea 2012
 Elected member of the Finnish Society of Sciences and Letters 2013  
 Silverstein-Simeone Award of the International Society of Chemical Ecology 2014
 International Ellis Island Medal of Honor 2016 
 Fellow of the African Academy of Sciences 2016
 Honorary Doctorate from the Faculty of Landscape Architecture, Horticulture and Crop Production Science, Swedish University of Agricultural  Sciences (SLU)
 Honorary Doctorate from the Czech University of Life Sciences Prague 
 In 2017 he became a member of the German Academy of Sciences Leopoldina.
 Gold Medal of the Royal Swedish Academy of Agriculture and Forestry 2021 
 Bundesverdienstkreuz 1. Klasse, 2021
 Foreign member of the Chinese Academy of Sciences

Selected publications
 Hansson, B.S., Christensen, T.A., Hildebrand, J.G,. (1991). Functionally distinct subdivisions of the macroglomerular complex in the antennal lobe of the male sphinx moth Manduca sexta. Journal of  Comparative Neurology, 312(2), 264-278. 
 Hansson, B. S., Ljungberg, H., Hallberg, E., Löfstedt, C. (1992). Functional specialization of olfactory glomeruli in a moth. Science 256:1313-1315. 
 Schiestl, F.P., Ayasse, M., Paulus, H.F., Löfstedt, C., Hansson, B.S., Ibarra, F., Francke, W. (1999). Orchid pollination by sexual swindle. Nature 399:421-422. 
 Hansson, B.S. (Hrsg.) (1999). Insect Olfaction. Springer Verlag, Heidelberg, 
 Stensmyr, M. C., Urru, I., Celander, M., Hansson, B.S. (2002). Rotting smell of dead-horse arum florets. Nature, 420, 625-626. 
 Wicher, D., Schäfer, R., Bauernfeind, R., Stensmyr, M. C., Heller, R., Heinemann, S. H., Hansson, B. S. (2008). Drosophila odorant receptors are both ligand-gated and cyclic-nucleotide-activated cation channels. Nature, 452(7190), 1007-1011. 
 Steck, K., Hansson, B. S., Knaden, M. (2009). Smells like home: desert ants, Cataglyphis fortis, use olfactory landmarks to pinpoint the nest. Frontiers in Zoology, 6, 5. 
 Stökl, J., Strutz, A., Dafni, A., Svatos, A., Doubský, J., Knaden, M., Sachse, S., Hansson, B., Stensmyr, M. C. (2010). A deceptive pollination system targeting drosophilids through olfactory mimicry of yeast. Current Biology, 20, 1846-1852. 
 Grosse-Wilde, E., Kuebler, L., Bucks, S., Vogel, H., Wicher, D., Hansson, B. (2011). Antennal transcriptome of Manduca sexta. Proceedings of the National Academy of Sciences of the United States of America, 108, 7449-7454. 
 Hansson, B., Stensmyr, M. C. (2011). Evolution of insect olfaction. Neuron, 72(5), 698-711. 
 Stensmyr, M. C., Dweck, H., Farhan, A., Ibba, I., Strutz, A., Mukunda, L., Linz, J., Grabe, V., Steck, K., Lavista Llanos, S., Wicher, D., Sachse, S., Knaden, M., Becher, P. G., Seki, Y., Hansson, B. S. (2012). A conserved dedicated olfactory circuit for detecting harmful microbes in Drosophila. Cell, 151(6), 1345-1357. 
 Dweck, H. K. M., Ebrahim, S. A. M., Kromann, S., Bown, D., Hillbur, Y., Sachse, S., Hansson, B. S., Stensmyr, M.C. (2013). Olfactory Preference for Egg Laying on Citrus Substrates in Drosophila. Current Biology, 23(24), 2472–2480.

References

External links 
Webpage of the Department of Evolutionary Neuroethology at the Max Planck Institute for Chemical Ecology

Video 
 Video on Bill S. Hansson's research (Latest Thinking)

Swedish scientists
Living people
1959 births
Chemical ecologists
Members of the German Academy of Sciences Leopoldina
Officers Crosses of the Order of Merit of the Federal Republic of Germany
Foreign members of the Chinese Academy of Sciences
Fellows of the African Academy of Sciences
Associate Fellows of the African Academy of Sciences
Max Planck Institute directors